The 2007 Pittsburgh Pirates season was the 126th season of the franchise; the 121st in the National League. This was their seventh season at PNC Park. The Pirates finished sixth and last in the National League Central with a record of 68–94.

Overview 

The Pirates began 2007 with a new majority owner, Robert Nutting, and the dreary fact that they could surpass the Philadelphia Phillies as owners of the longest consecutive losing seasons record in baseball, having last had a winning season in 1992. However, in spite of finishing 5th in the NL Central, the Pirates were hoping that their 2nd half momentum from 2006 would carry over into 2007.

In addition to NL batting champion Freddy Sanchez and slugger Jason Bay, the Bucs acquired Adam LaRoche from Atlanta in January, hoping to boost offensive power. In addition, they re-signed pitcher Shawn Chacón, acquired from the Yankees last summer, and signed Tony Armas Jr. to help bolster their starting rotation, led by Ian Snell and Tom Gorzelanny.

Just before the All Star game, team CEO Kevin McClatchy announced at the end of the season he would be stepping down from the position. He maintained that he would "remain as the active leader of the organization" to give the team ample time to find a successor and "ensure a smooth transition into the next chapter of Pirates history."

Regular season

The Pirates' season started well, as they swept the Houston Astros in Houston for the first time since 1991, when the Astros played in the Astrodome. However, that initial success didn't carry for very long, as the Bucs proceeded to lose 11 of their next 13 games. The Pirates pulled out of their early slump to post a 12-12 record at the end of April. May, however, would to be quite tumultuous, as Tony Armas was sent to the bullpen for poor performance, Zach Duke struggled mightily, the bullpen blew several late leads, and closer Salomón Torres was stripped of his closer's duties, in favor of youngster Matt Capps after Torres blew a 2-run ninth-inning lead against the San Diego Padres on May 31.

After the All-Star Break, the Pirates started off by losing 7 games in a row, and 8 out of 9 overall. Paul "Big Poison" Waner's number 11 was retired in a pregame ceremony at PNC Park July 21, 2007,  conducted in part by members of his family and Pirate greats Bill Mazeroski and Ralph Kiner.

Fans protest 

Frustrated by the consistent losing, poor drafting, and the ownership's inability to retain players due to payroll constraints, fans led by Pittsburgh Business Executive Andrew Chomos organized a much-publicized walkout for June 30.  There were also a pre-game protest rally outside the stadium, including the appearance and speaking of former Pirate Doc Ellis, who stated he has been "embarrassed to be called a Pirate over the last 15 years".  Despite the best efforts by the Pirates to downplay the protest, it became so publicized that management was forced to acknowledge its existence. Then Pirate CEO Kevin McClatchy resigned 2 days after the protest.  The protest periodically appeared in news articles as it did in the August 2010 issue of Sports Illustrated and was also a topical conversation on ESPN and CNN programs.

Season standings

Game log

|- style="background:#cfc;"
| 1 || April 2 || @ Astros || 4–2  || Capps (1–0) || Qualls (0–1) || S. Torres (1) || 43,803 || 1–0
|- style="background:#cfc;"
| 2 || April 3 || @ Astros || 3–2 || Bayliss (1–0) || Wheeler (0–1) || S. Torres (2) || 31,238 || 2–0
|- style="background:#cfc;"
| 3 || April 4 || @ Astros || 5–4 || Gorzelanny (1–0) || W. Williams (0–1) || S. Torres (3) || 25,961 || 3–0
|- style="background:#fcc;"
| 4 || April 6 || @ Reds || 1–6 || Belisle (1–0) || Maholm (0–1) || — || 17,837 || 3–1
|- style="background:#fcc;"
| 5 || April 7 || @ Reds || 5–7 || Harang (2–0) || Armas (0–1) || Weathers (2) || 15,825 || 3–2
|- style="background:#cfc;"
| 6 || April 8 || @ Reds || 6–3 || Duke (1–0) || Milton (0–1) || S. Torres (4) || 14,001 || 4–2
|- style="background:#fcc;"
| 7 || April 9 || Cardinals || 0–3 || Looper (1–1) || Snell (0–1) || Isringhausen (2) || 38,429 || 4–3
|- style="background:#fcc;"
| 8 || April 10 || Cardinals || 2–3  || B. Thompson (1–0) || Wasdin (0–1) || Isringhausen (3) || 12,468 || 4–4
|- style="background:#fcc;"
| 9 || April 11 || Cardinals || 2–3 || Franklin (1–0) || S. Torres (0–1) || — || 9,959 || 4–5
|- style="background:#fcc;"
| 10 || April 13 || Giants || 5–8 || Ortiz (1–1) || Duke (1–1) || — || 22,117 || 4–6
|- style="background:#bbb;"
| – || April 14 || Giants || colspan=5|Postponed (rain)  || 4–6
|- style="background:#bbb;"
| – || April 15 || Giants || colspan=5|Postponed (rain)  || 4–6
|- style="background:#cfc;"
| 11 || April 16 || @ Cardinals || 3–2 || Snell (1–1) || An. Reyes (0–2) || S. Torres (5) || 43,026 || 5–6
|- style="background:#cfc;"
| 12 || April 17 || @ Cardinals || 6–1 || Gorzelanny (2–0) || Wainwright (1–1) || — || 42,446 || 6–6
|- style="background:#fcc;"
| 13 || April 18 || @ Brewers || 3–7 || C. Vargas (1–0) || Maholm (0–2) || — || 22,331 || 6–7
|- style="background:#fcc;"
| 14 || April 19 || @ Brewers || 5–7 || Suppan (2–2) || Duke (1–2) || F. Cordero (5) || 17,386 || 6–8
|- style="background:#fcc;"
| 15 || April 20 || @ Dodgers || 2–10 || Wolf (3–1) || Armas (0–2) || — || 43,845 || 6–9
|- style="background:#fcc;"
| 16 || April 21 || @ Dodgers || 3–7  || Broxton (1–0) || Bayliss (1–1) || — || 48,995 || 6–10
|- style="background:#cfc;"
| 17 || April 22 || @ Dodgers || 7–5 || Gorzelanny (3–0) || Tomko (0–1) || S. Torres (6) || 46,741 || 7–10
|- style="background:#cfc;"
| 18 || April 24 || Astros || 3–0 || Maholm (1–2) || W. Williams (0–3) || — || 13,062 || 8–10
|- style="background:#cfc;"
| 19 || April 25 || Astros || 4–3  || Wasdin (1–1) || Moehler (0–1) || — || 8,201 || 9–10
|- style="background:#cfc;"
| 20 || April 26 || Astros || 5–3 || Bayliss (2–1) || W. Rodríguez (0–3) || Grabow (1) || 12,056 || 10–10
|- style="background:#cfc;"
| 21 || April 27 || Reds || 3–1 || Snell (2–1) || Milton (0–4) || S. Torres (7) || 22,638 || 11–10
|- style="background:#fcc;"
| 22 || April 28 || Reds || 1–8 || Belisle (3–1) || Gorzelanny (3–1) || — || 29,514 || 11–11
|- style="background:#fcc;"
| 23 || April 29 || Reds || 5–9 || Harang (4–0) || Maholm (1–3) || — || 18,409 || 11–12
|- style="background:#cfc;"
| 24 || April 30 || Cubs || 3–2 || Capps (2–0) || Wuertz (0–1) || S. Torres (8) || 11,437 || 12–12

! width="5%"  | Record
|- style="background:#fcc;"
| 25 || May 1 || Cubs || 6–8 || Cherry (1–1) || Bayliss (2–2) || — || 13,082 || 12–13
|- style="background:#fcc;"
| 26 || May 2 || Cubs || 1–7 || Marquis (4–1) || Snell (2–2) || — || 21,765 || 12–14
|- style="background:#cfc;"
| 27 || May 3 || @ Brewers || 4–2 || Gorzelanny (4–1) || Bush (2–3)   || S. Torres (9) || 15,602 || 13–14
|- style="background:#fcc;"
| 28 || May 4 || @ Brewers || 0–10 || C. Vargas (3–0) || Maholm (1–4) || — || 40,190 || 13–15
|- style="background:#fcc;"
| 29 || May 5 || @ Brewers || 3–6 || Suppan (5–2) || Duke (1–3) || F. Cordero (11) || 40,361 || 13–16
|- style="background:#fcc;"
| 30 || May 6 || @ Brewers || 4–6 || Villanueva (3–0) || Grabow (0–1) || F. Cordero (12) || 37,761 || 13–17
|- style="background:#cfc;"
| 31 || May 8 || @ Cubs || 4–3  || Bayliss (3–2) || Cotts (0–1) || S. Torres (10) || 39,708 || 14–17
|- style="background:#fcc;"
| 32 || May 9 || @ Cubs || 0–1 || Marquis (5–1) || Gorzelanny (4–2) || — || 40,264 || 14–18
|- style="background:#cfc;"
| 33 || May 10 || @ Cubs || 6–4 || Maholm (2–4) || C. Zambrano (3–3) || S. Torres (11) || 41,101 || 15–18
|- style="background:#fcc;"
| 34 || May 11 || Braves || 1–4 || Davies (1–1) || Duke (1–4) || M. González (2) || 23,376 || 15–19
|- style="background:#fcc;"
| 35 || May 12 || Braves || 2–9 || James (4–3) || Armas (0–3) || — || 34,775 || 15–20
|- style="background:#cfc;"
| 36 || May 13 || Braves || 13–2 || Snell (3–2) || Lerew (0–1) || — || 19,484 || 16–20
|- style="background:#cfc;"
| 37 || May 14 || Marlins || 7–0 || Gorzelanny (5–2) || Willis (5–3) || — || 12,958 || 17–20
|- style="background:#fcc;"
| 38 || May 15 || Marlins || 3–9 || Mitre (1–2) || Maholm (2–5) || — || 12,769 || 17–21
|- style="background:#fcc;"
| 39 || May 16 || Marlins || 3–4 || Tankersley (3–1) || Capps (2–1) || Gregg (2) || 15,086 || 17–22
|- style="background:#cfc;"
| 40 || May 17 || Marlins || 7–2 || Chacón (1–0) || Nolasco (1–2) || — || 9,582 || 18–22
|- style="background:#cfc;"
| 41 || May 18 || D-backs || 11–5 || Snell (4–2) || D. Davis (2–5) || — || 32,682 || 19–22
|- style="background:#fcc;"
| 42 || May 19 || D-backs || 8–9 || Slaten (1–0) || Capps (2–2) || Valverde (15) || 30,677 || 19–23
|- style="background:#fcc;"
| 43 || May 20 || D-backs || 2–5 || Ra. Johnson (2–2) || Maholm (2–6) || Valverde (16) || 24,282 || 19–24
|- style="background:#fcc;"
| 44 || May 22 || @ Cardinals || 4–9 || Wainwright (4–3) || Duke (1–5) || — || 42,679 || 19–25
|- style="background:#fcc;"
| 45 || May 23 || @ Cardinals || 3–5 || K. Wells (2–8) || Snell (4–3) || Isringhausen (11) || 42,245 || 19–26
|- style="background:#fcc;"
| 46 || May 24 || @ Cardinals || 1–3 || Looper (6–3) || Gorzelanny (5–3) || Isringhausen (12) || 44,296 || 19–27
|- style="background:#cfc;"
| 47 || May 25 || @ Reds || 10–4  || Bayliss (4–2) || Weathers (1–3) || — || 36,455 || 20–27
|- style="background:#cfc;"
| 48 || May 26 || @ Reds || 9–5 || Grabow (1–1) || Arroyo (2–5) || — || 32,280 || 21–27
|- style="background:#cfc;"
| 49 || May 27 || @ Reds || 14–10 || Duke (2–5) || Saarloos (0–4) || — || 27,209 || 22–27
|- style="background:#fcc;"
| 50 || May 28 || @ Reds || 0–4 || Lohse (2–6) || Snell (4–4) || — || 17,905 || 22–28
|- style="background:#cfc;"
| 51 || May 29 || Padres || 4–1 || Gorzelanny (6–3) || D. Wells (2–3) || S. Torres (12) || 15,794 || 23–28
|- style="background:#fcc;"
| 52 || May 30 || Padres || 0–9 || C. Young (6–3) || Maholm (2–7) || — || 12,734 || 23–29
|- style="background:#fcc;"
| 53 || May 31 || Padres || 2–4  || Meredith (3–2) || Sharpless (0–1) || Hoffman (16) || 14,966 || 23–30

|- style="background:#fcc;"
| 54 || June 1 || Dodgers || 4–5 || Wolf (7–3) || Duke (2–6) || Saito (16) || 20,164 || 23–31
|- style="background:#cfc;"
| 55 || June 2 || Dodgers || 3–1 || Snell (5–4) || Kuo (0–1) || Capps (1) || 31,931 || 24–31
|- style="background:#fcc;"
| 56 || June 3 || Dodgers || 4–5 || Billingsley (4–0) || S. Torres (0–2) || Beimel (1) || 23,458 || 24–32
|- style="background:#fcc;"
| 57 || June 4 || Dodgers || 5–6 || D. Lowe (6–5) || Maholm (2–8) || Broxton (1) || 15,836 || 24–33
|- style="background:#cfc;"
| 58 || June 5 || @ Nationals || 7–6 || Chacón (2–0) || Bacsik (1–2) || Capps (2) || 19,169 || 25–33
|- style="background:#fcc;"
| 59 || June 6 || @ Nationals || 5–6 || C. Cordero (1–0) || S. Torres (0–3) || — || 24,755 || 25–34
|- style="background:#cfc;"
| 60 || June 7 || @ Nationals || 3–2 || Capps (3–2) || C. Cordero (1–1) || — || 25,622 || 26–34
|- style="background:#fcc;"
| 61 || June 8 || @ Yankees || 4–5  || M. Rivera (2–3) || Capps (3–3) || — || 54,240 || 26–35
|- style="background:#fcc;"
| 62 || June 9 || @ Yankees || 3–9 || Clemens (1–0) || Maholm (2–9) || — || 54,296 || 26–36
|- style="background:#fcc;"
| 63 || June 10 || @ Yankees || 6–13 || Henn (2–0) || Chacón (2–1) || — || 54,292 || 26–37
|- style="background:#cfc;"
| 64 || June 12 || Rangers || 7–5 || Duke (3–6) || Millwood (2–6) || Capps (3) || 21,158 || 27–37
|- style="background:#cfc;"
| 65 || June 13 || Rangers || 8–1 || Snell (6–4) || R. Tejeda (5–7) || — || 16,110 || 28–37
|- style="background:#fcc;"
| 66 || June 14 || Rangers || 0–6 || Loe (2–6) || Gorzelanny (6–4) || — || 17,214 || 28–38
|- style="background:#cfc;"
| 67 || June 15 || White Sox || 4–2 || Maholm (3–9) || Garland (4–4) || Capps (4) || 26,647 || 29–38
|- style="background:#fcc;"
| 68 || June 16 || White Sox || 1–6 || Buehrle (4–3) || Van Benschoten (0–1)  || — || 36,610 || 29–39
|- style="background:#cfc;"
| 69 || June 17 || White Sox || 8–7 || Chacón (3–1) || Masset (2–3) || Capps (5) || 26,830 || 30–39
|- style="background:#cfc;"
| 70 || June 19 || @ Mariners || 5–3 || Gorzelanny (7–4) || M. Batista (7–6) || Chacón (1) || 24,520 || 31–39
|- style="background:#fcc;"
| 71 || June 20 || @ Mariners || 0–7 || Jeff Weaver (1–6) || Maholm (3–10) || — || 23,553 || 31–40
|- style="background:#fcc;"
| 72 || June 21 || @ Mariners || 0–3 || F. Hernández (4–4) || Van Benschoten (0–2) || Putz (20) || 22,950 || 31–41
|- style="background:#fcc;"
| 73 || June 22 || @ Angels || 4–5  || S. Shields (1–2) || Bayliss (4–3) || — || 43,545 || 31–42
|- style="background:#fcc;"
| 74 || June 23 || @ Angels || 1–10 || K. Escobar (9–3) || Snell (6–5) || — || 44,010 || 31–43
|- style="background:#fcc;"
| 75 || June 24 || @ Angels || 3–4  || Bootcheck (2–1) || Capps (3–4) || — || 42,346 || 31–44
|- style="background:#cfc;"
| 76 || June 26 || @ Marlins || 3–2 || Maholm (4–10) || Willis (7–7) || Capps (6) || 11,044 || 32–44
|- style="background:#cfc;"
| 77 || June 27 || @ Marlins || 7–5  || Chacón (4–1) || Gregg (0–3) || Capps (7) || 11,222 || 33–44
|- style="background:#fcc;"
| 78 || June 28 || @ Marlins || 7–9 || Olsen (6–6) || Duke (3–7) || — || 31,628 || 33–45
|- style="background:#cfc;"
| 79 || June 29 || Nationals || 3–2 || Capps (4–4) || Rauch (3–2) || — || 32,361 || 34–45
|- style="background:#cfc;"
| 80 || June 30 || Nationals || 7–2 || Gorzelanny (8–4) || Bergmann (1–5) || — || 26,959 || 35–45

|- style="background:#fcc;"
| 81 || July 1 || Nationals || 2–3 || Bacsik (2–5) || Maholm (4–11) || C. Cordero (14) || 19,149 || 35–46
|- style="background:#fcc;"
| 82 || July 2 || Brewers || 3–10 || Villanueva (6–0) || Kuwata (0–1) || — || 14,455 || 35–47
|- style="background:#cfc;"
| 83 || July 3 || Brewers || 6–2 || Youman (1–0) || Gallardo (1–1) || — || 25,416 || 36–47
|- style="background:#cfc;"
| 84 || July 4 || Brewers || 5–3 || Snell (7–5) || C. Vargas (6–2) || Capps (8) || 35,878 || 37–47
|- style="background:#cfc;"
| 85 || July 5 || Brewers || 6–3 || Gorzelanny (9–4) || Sheets (10–4) || Capps (9) || 15,134 || 38–47
|- style="background:#cfc;"
| 86 || July 6 || Cubs || 8–4 || Maholm (5–11) || Marquis (6–5) || — || 27,868 || 39–47
|- style="background:#fcc;"
| 87 || July 7 || Cubs || 1–7 || Lilly (8–4) || Van Benschoten (0–3) || — || 33,293 || 39–48
|- style="background:#cfc;"
| 88 || July 8 || Cubs || 6–2 || Youman (2–0) || C. Zambrano (10–7) || — || 22,470 || 40–48
|- style="background:#fcc;"
| 89 || July 13 || @ Braves || 1–9 || T. Hudson (9–5) || Snell (7–6) || — || 38,922 || 40–49
|- style="background:#fcc;"
| 90 || July 14 || @ Braves || 4–5 || Wickman (2–2) || Chacón (4–2) || — || 44,041 || 40–50
|- style="background:#fcc;"
| 91 || July 15 || @ Braves || 1–5 || Carlyle (4–2) || Maholm (5–12) || — || 30,756 || 40–51
|- style="background:#fcc;"
| 92 || July 16 || Rockies || 8–10 || Hawkins (1–4) || Van Benschoten (0–4) || Corpas (2) || 16,423 || 40–52
|- style="background:#fcc;"
| 93 || July 17 || Rockies || 2–6 || Fogg (5–6) || Youman (2–1) || — || 21,604 || 40–53
|- style="background:#fcc;"
| 94 || July 18 || Rockies || 3–5 || Francis (10–5) || Snell (7–7) || Corpas (3) || 19,285 || 40–54
|- style="background:#fcc;"
| 95 || July 20 || Astros || 1–2 || Oswalt (9–6) || Gorzelanny (9–5) || Lidge (2) || 33,541 || 40–55
|- style="background:#cfc;"
| 96 || July 21 || Astros || 7–3 || Maholm (6–12) || W. Rodríguez (6–9) || — || 32,068 || 41–55
|- style="background:#fcc;"
| 97 || July 22 || Astros || 0–1 || W. Williams (5–11) || Youman (2–2) || Lidge (3) || 22,404 || 41–56
|- style="background:#fcc;"
| 98 || July 24 || @ Mets || 4–8 || Maine (11–5) || Snell (7–8) || — || 49,122 || 41–57
|- style="background:#fcc;"
| 99 || July 25 || @ Mets || 3–6 || Glavine (9–6) || Gorzelanny (9–6) || B. Wagner (23) || 44,906 || 41–58
|- style="background:#cfc;"
| 100 || July 26 || @ Mets || 8–4 || Maholm (7–12) || Ól. Pérez (9–7) || — || 52,150 || 42–58
|- style="background:#fcc;"
| 101 || July 27 || @ Phillies || 1–8  || Moyer (9–8) || Van Benschoten (0–5) || — || 37,136 || 42–59
|- style="background:#fcc;"
| 102 || July 28 || @ Phillies || 5–10 || Durbin (3–2) || Youman (2–3) || — || 45,149 || 42–60
|- style="background:#fcc;"
| 103 || July 29 || @ Phillies || 1–5 || Kendrick (5–1) || Snell (7–9) || — || 40,030 || 42–61
|- style="background:#fcc;"
| 104 || July 31 || Cardinals || 4–6 || Wainwright (10–8) || Maholm (7–13) || Isringhausen (21) || 24,085 || 42–62

|- style="background:#cfc;"
| 105 || August 1 || Cardinals || 15–1 || Armas (1–3) || Looper (8–9) || — || 17,041 || 43–62
|- style="background:#cfc;"
| 106 || August 2 || Cardinals || 5–4  || S. Torres (1–3) || B. Thompson (6–5) || — || 19,132 || 44–62
|- style="background:#fcc;"
| 107 || August 3 || Reds || 4–13 || Belisle (6–8) || Snell (7–10) || — || 22,874 || 44–63
|- style="background:#fcc;"
| 108 || August 4 || Reds || 8–9  || Burton (3–1) || Capps (4–5) || Weathers (21) || 33,466 || 44–64
|- style="background:#bbb;"
| – || August 5 || Reds || colspan=5|Postponed (rain)  || 44–64
|- style="background:#cfc;"
| 109 || August 7 || @ D-backs || 8–3 || Gorzelanny (10–6) || Owings (5–6) || — || 25,340 || 45–64
|- style="background:#fcc;"
| 110 || August 8 || @ D-backs || 6–10 || Éd. González (5–2) || Maholm (7–14) || Valverde (34) || 23,082 || 45–65
|- style="background:#fcc;"
| 111 || August 9 || @ D-backs || 2–4 || S. Davis (9–10) || Chacón (4–3) || Valverde (35) || 22,316 || 45–66
|- style="background:#cfc;"
| 112 || August 10 || @ Giants || 8–7 || Grabow (2–1) || Chulk (4–4) || Capps (10) || 41,923 || 46–66
|- style="background:#cfc;"
| 113 || August 11 || @ Giants || 13–3 || Armas (2–3) || Lincecum (6–3) || — || 43,105 || 47–66
|- style="background:#cfc;"
| 114 || August 12 || @ Giants || 5–0 || Gorzelanny (11–6) || Zito (8–11) || — || 41,976 || 48–66
|- style="background:#cfc;"
| 115 || August 13 || Giants || 3–1 || Maholm (8–14) || Cain (4–13) || — ||  || 49–66
|- style="background:#fcc;"
| 116 || August 13 || Giants || 3–10 || Lowry (13–7) || Youman (2–4) || — || 25,434 || 49–67
|- style="background:#fcc;"
| 117 || August 14 || Mets || 4–5 || J. Sosa (9–6) || Torres (1–4) || B. Wagner (27) || 25,277 || 49–68
|- style="background:#fcc;"
| 118 || August 15 || Mets || 8–10 || Maine (13–7) || Morris (7–8) || B. Wagner (28) || 18,241 || 49–69
|- style="background:#cfc;"
| 119 || August 16 || Mets || 10–7 || D. Marte (1–0) || Heilman (7–5) || Capps (11) || 36,447 || 50–69
|- style="background:#fcc;"
| 120 || August 17 || Phillies || 8–11 || J. D. Durbin (5–2) || Gorzelanny (11–7) || — || 37,072 || 50–70
|- style="background:#cfc;"
| 121 || August 18 || Phillies || 11–6 || Maholm (9–14) || Moyer (11–9) || — || 38,152 || 51–70
|- style="background:#cfc;"
| 122 || August 19 || Phillies || 8–4 || Snell (8–10) || Romero (1–1) ||  || 31,277 || 52–70
|- style="background:#cfc;"
| 123 || August 20 || @ Rockies || 4–2 || D. Marte (2–0) || Fuentes (0–5) || Capps (12) || 22,682 || 53–70
|- style="background:#fcc;"
| 124 || August 21 || @ Rockies || 2–9 || T. Buchholz (6–4) || Armas (2–4) || — || 21,136 || 53–71
|- style="background:#cfc;"
| 125 || August 22 || @ Rockies || 11–2 || Gorzelanny (12–7) || Fogg (7–9) || — || 20,629 || 54–71
|- style="background:#cfc;"
| 126 || August 23 || @ Rockies || 5–1 || Maholm (10–14) || F. Morales (0–1) || — || 20,380 || 55–71
|- style="background:#cfc;"
| 127 || August 24 || @ Astros || 8–3  || Youman (3–4) || Driskill (0–1) || — || 41,403 || 56–71
|- style="background:#cfc;"
| 128 || August 25 || @ Astros || 4–1 || Morris (8–8)  || Patton (0–1) || Capps (13) || 41,109 || 57–71
|- style="background:#fcc;"
| 129 || August 26 || @ Astros || 4–5 || McLemore (3–0) || Chacón (4–4) || Lidge (13) || 42,564 || 57–72
|- style="background:#cfc;"
| 130 || August 28 || Reds || 6–4 || Gorzelanny (13–7) || El. Ramírez (0–2) || Capps (14) || — || 58–72
|- style="background:#cfc;"
| 131 || August 28 || Reds || 3–2 || Chacón (5–4)  || Bray (3–1) || Capps (15) || 17,669 || 59–72
|- style="background:#fcc;"
| 132 || August 29 || Reds || 0–8 || Harang (14–3) || Snell (8–11) || — || 14,191 || 59–73
|- style="background:#fcc;"
| 133 || August 30 || Reds || 4–5 || Burton (4–1) || Capps (4–6) || Weathers (29) || 12,643 || 59–74
|- style="background:#fcc;"
| 134 || August 31 || @ Brewers || 2–3 || Gallardo (6–4) || Armas (2–5) || F. Cordero (38) || 35,689 || 59–75

|- style="background:#fcc;"
| 135 || September 1 || @ Brewers || 3–12 || Bush (11–9) || Youman (3–5) || — || 34,190 || 59–76
|- style="background:#fcc;"
| 136 || September 2 || @ Brewers || 4–7 || Suppan (9–11) || Osoria (0–1) || F. Cordero (39) || 39,339 || 59–77
|- style="background:#cfc;"
| 137 || September 3 || @ Cardinals || 11–0 || Snell (9–11) || K. Wells (6–16) || — || 42,238 || 60–77
|- style="background:#fcc;"
| 138 || September 4 || @ Cardinals || 2–6 || Piñeiro (5–3) || Morris (8–9) || Franklin (1) || 42,300 || 60–78
|- style="background:#cfc;"
| 139 || September 5 || @ Cardinals || 8–2 || Armas (3–5) || Mulder (0–1) || — || 42,299 || 61–78
|- style="background:#fcc;"
| 140 || September 6 || @ Cardinals || 4–16 || Jiménez (2–0) || Bullington (0–1) || — || 42,330 || 61–79
|- style="background:#cfc;"
| 141 || September 7 || Cubs || 6–1 || Gorzelanny (14–7) || R. Hill (8–8) || — || 24,489 || 62–79
|- style="background:#fcc;"
| 142 || September 8 || Cubs || 1–5 || C. Zambrano (15–12) || Snell (9–12) || — || 33,373 || 62–80
|- style="background:#cfc;"
| 143 || September 9 || Cubs || 10–5 || Morris (9–9)  || Trachsel (6–10) || — || 21,861 || 63–80
|- style="background:#cfc;"
| 144 || September 10 || Brewers || 9–0 || Armas (4–5) || Villanueva (7–4) || — || 13,683 || 64–80
|- style="background:#fcc;"
| 145 || September 11 || Brewers || 1–6 || Gallardo (8–4) || Bullington (0–2) || — || 11,962 || 64–81
|- style="background:#cfc;"
| 146 || September 12 || Brewers || 7–4 || Grabow (3–1) || Turnbow (4–5) || Capps (16) || 10,566 || 65–81
|- style="background:#cfc;"
| 147 || September 14 || @ Astros || 4–3 || Sánchez (1–0) || Qualls (6–5) || Capps (17) || 35,352 || 66–81
|- style="background:#fcc;"
| 148 || September 15 || @ Astros || 7–9 || Gutiérrez (1–1) || Morris (9–10) || Lidge (15) || 40,425 || 66–82
|- style="background:#fcc;"
| 149 || September 16 || @ Astros || 3–15 || Backe (1–1) || Maholm (10–15) || — || 35,715 || 66–83
|- style="background:#fcc;"
| 150 || September 17 || @ Padres || 0–3 || Cassel (1–0) || Van Benschoten (0–6) || Hoffman (38) || 33,557 || 66–84
|- style="background:#fcc;"
| 151 || September 18 || @ Padres || 3–5 || Maddux (13–10) || Gorzelanny (14–8) || Hoffman (39) || 30,629 || 66–85
|- style="background:#fcc;"
| 152 || September 19 || @ Padres || 3–5 || Meredith (5–6) || Capps (4–7) || — || 26,354 || 66–86
|- style="background:#fcc;"
| 153 || September 20 || @ Padres || 3–6 || Tomko (4–11) || Morris (9–11) || Hoffman (40) || 27,020 || 66–87
|- style="background:#fcc;"
| 154 || September 21 || @ Cubs || 8–13 || Eyre (2–1) || Osoria (0–2) || — || 41,591 || 66–88
|- style="background:#fcc;"
| 155 || September 22 || @ Cubs || 5–9 || Hill (10–8) || Duke (3–8) || — || 41,271 || 66–89
|- style="background:#fcc;"
| 156 || September 23 || @ Cubs || 0–8 || Zambrano (17–13) || Gorzelanny (14–9) || — || 41,364 || 66–90
|- style="background:#cfc;"
| 157 || September 25 || D-backs || 6–5 || Torres (2–4) || Lyon (6–4) || Capps (18) || 14,569 || 67–90
|- style="background:#cfc;"
| 158 || September 26 || D-backs || 5–1 || Morris (10–11) || Hernández (11–11) || — || 16,289 || 68–90
|- style="background:#fcc;"
| 159 || September 27 || D-backs || 0–8 || Owings (8–8) || Van Benschoten (0–7) || — || 11,335 || 68–91
|- style="background:#fcc;"
| 160 || September 28 || Cardinals || 1–6 || Springer (8–1) || Grabow (3–2) || — || 30,603 || 68–92
|- style="background:#fcc;"
| 161 || September 29 || Cardinals || 3–7 || Wainwright (14–12) || Gorzelanny (14–10) || — || 35,169 || 68–93
|- style="background:#fcc;"
| 162 || September 30 || Cardinals || 5–6 || Wells (7–17) || Bullington (0–3) || Isringhausen (32) || 25,664 || 68–94

|-
| Legend:       = Win       = Loss       = PostponementBold = Pirates team member       Source = baseball-reference.com

Record vs. opponents

Detailed records

Roster

Opening Day lineup

Statistics
Hitting
Note: G = Games played; AB = At bats; H = Hits; Avg. = Batting average; HR = Home runs; RBI = Runs batted in

Pitching
Note: G = Games pitched; IP = Innings pitched; W = Wins; L = Losses; ERA = Earned run average; SO = Strikeouts

2007 Pittsburgh Pirates stats at Baseball Reference.com

Awards and honors

2007 Major League Baseball All-Star Game
Freddy Sanchez, 2B, reserve

Farm system

References

Game Logs:
1st Half: Pittsburgh Pirates Game Log on ESPN.com
2nd Half: Pittsburgh Pirates Game Log on ESPN.com
Batting Statistics: Pittsburgh Pirates Batting Stats on ESPN.com
Pitching Statistics: Pittsburgh Pirates Pitching Stats on ESPN.com
Fans Protest / Walkout:'
Walkout by Pirates fans gets blacked out 
Pirates Fan Protest, Walkout Still On For Weekend 
Pirates fans group pushing in-game walkout Saturday 
'Fans for Change' ready for Pirates protest 

Pittsburgh Pirates seasons
Pittsburgh Pirates season
Pitts